Axl may refer to:

People
 Axl Rose, lead singer of Guns N' Roses
 Axl Rotten, ring name for former professional wrestler Brian Knighton (1971–2016)
 Axl Hazarika, an Indian musician
 Axl Beats, a British drill music producer

Fictional characters
 Axl Low, a character in the Guilty Gear video game series
 Axl Heck, a fictional character from the television sitcom, The Middle
 Axl (Mega Man X), a fictional character in the game series Mega Man X made by Capcom
 Axl, a fictional character from the animated television series Nexo Knights
 Axl, a character from Taz-Mania

Other
 AXL receptor tyrosine kinase in biochemistry, a member of the receptor tyrosine kinase family of cell surface receptors
 A.X.L., a 2018 American science fiction film featuring Becky G

See also 

 Axel (disambiguation)
 Axle
 AXI (disambiguation)
 ax1 (disambiguation)